Roger Donald Blake (born 21 December 1957 in Neath, Glamorgan) is a Welsh actor, impressionist and entertainer. He is best known for his portrayal of Prince Philip in Spitting Image and The Big Impression and Noël Coward in television commercials, and narrated Roald Dahl's The Enormous Crocodile, The Twits, as well as the Topsy and Tim animated series from 1984 to 1989.

Career
Blake had a steady career, he made appearances in British television sitcoms such as Blackadder II, Only Fools and Horses and Dear John. In 1990, he joined the cast of Spitting Image, where he became well known as the voice of Prince Philip, he also voiced other characters including George H. W. Bush, Robert Maxwell, John Prescott and Arnold Schwarzenegger.

It was on Spitting Image that he met Alistair McGowan, when the show was axed in May 1996, McGowan invited him to join him on his new television show The Big Impression, where again he voiced Prince Philip but also he became famous as the voice of Jim Royle in The Royle Family sketches. Blake was also known for his impression of Noël Coward, he played the playwright in television commercials for coffee and he appeared as Coward himself in the Series Four finale of Red Dwarf (Meltdown).

He made a brief appearance in the film Patriot Games, as a Constable. He voiced a policeman, as well as a balloon seller, in the movie Flushed Away in November 2006.

Filmography

References

External links
 

1957 births
Living people
British impressionists (entertainers)
People from Neath
Welsh male television actors
Welsh male film actors
Welsh male voice actors
Audiobook narrators